Jaegeria gracilis is a flowering plant species in the family Asteraceae found only in Ecuador.

References

Flora of Ecuador
Millerieae